Cyperus onerosus is a species of sedge that is native to parts of Texas.

See also 
 List of Cyperus species

References 

onerosus
Plants described in 1964
Flora of Texas